Kovvada Atomic Power Project is a proposed 6,600 MW nuclear power station in the state of Andhra Pradesh, India. The project is planned over an area of  2067 acres. According to a GV Ramesh, the project director at NPCIL, close to 485 acres of land has already been handed over for the project by the Srikakulam district administration. The acquisition of the remaining 1582 acres of land is expected to be completed by October 2017.

See also 
 Kovvada, Srikakulam

References

Nuclear power stations using AP1000 reactors
Nuclear power stations in Andhra Pradesh
Proposed power stations in India